Sabarmati Junction railway station is a junction station of the Indian Western Railway in Ahmedabad, Gujarat. Sabarmati Junction has 2 tracks, the Mehsana line, and the Botad line, in addition to the main broad-gauge line for trains departing from Ahmedabad. The station has a dedicated rail yard for passenger trains, and was proposed in 2010 for development as an additional terminal for Delhi-bound trains.

Parts of station
It is divided in two parts Sabarmati Junction (SBT) and Sabarmati Junction BG (SBIB). Sabarmati SBT lies on Ahmedabad–Viramgam-Gandhidham main line which contains three platforms. While Sabarmati BG lies of Ahmedabad–Delhi main line, Ahmedabad–Gandhinagar line and Ahmedabad–Botad line which contains seven platforms.

Diesel locomotive shed
Diesel Loco Shed, Sabarmati holds over 121 EMD locomotives, including the WDP 4D, WDG4, WDG 4D, and WDG-5.

Proposed features 

The Indian Railway Stations Development Corporation selected Sabarmati Junction to be redeveloped in a public-private partnership. The corporation, a joint venture of the Rail Land Development Authority and the state-owned Ircon International, invited requests for qualifications to redevelop the station; nine applications from developers and funders were received.

The station's theme is the Dandi March led by Mahatma Gandhi, who lived in Sabarmati. The redevelopment planned to revamp and connect the existing Sabarmati broad-gauge lines for passenger convenience. The proposed Mumbai-Ahmedabad high-speed bullet train, developed by the National High Speed Rail Corporation Limited (NHSRCL), is expected to pass between the lines. The rebuilt station will have a passage to access the bullet-train corridor.

The Mumbai–Ahmedabad high-speed rail corridor, which is under construction, is expected to pass between the existing lines. According to IRSDC, the two stations will be redeveloped and integrated with each other, providing a smooth and easier access for passengers. This integration will also have a passage for accessing the high-speed bullet train corridor. The Sabarmati Junction redevelopment project includes:
The redeveloped station will access the Ahmedabad Metro station, also under construction.
Comfortable waiting rooms, retail shops, food and beverage stalls, entertainment venues, and other facilities
Footbridge access
Wheelchair-friendliness and green construction

References

External links 
 Sabarmati Junction Railway Station
 Sabarmati Junction Railway Station Rail Info 
 Train and passenger name record enquiries

Railway stations in Ahmedabad
Railway junction stations in Gujarat
Ahmedabad railway division
Year of establishment missing